Penhawitz was Sachem of the Canarsee band of Munsee in the 1630s and 1640s, and cultivated a relationship with the government of New Netherland. He was the first Long Island sachem known to the Dutch, and was based in modern Brooklyn.

Penhawitz, along with fellow Canarsee Kakapetteyno, facilitated the "purchase" of Flatlands, Brooklyn by Andries Hudde and Wolfert Gerritse in 1636. His group's longhouse at modern Canarsie, Brooklyn was labeled Keskachaue on the 1639 Manatus Map (the westernmost field sold to the Dutch was Keskateuw); with increasing Dutch encroachment, it does not appear on later maps. In 1640, Penhawitz alerted his colonial allies to an English expedition to Long Island that had torn down the copper Dutch Republic Lion off of a tree, and they foiled the occupation

After the initial massacres of Native Americans that began Kieft's War, he invited David Pietersz. de Vries to come to Rockaway for a negotiation with many Long Island Native leaders. Described at this time as one-eyed, Penhawitz joined De Vries on his return to Fort Amsterdam to sign a peace treaty, which did not hold. His son Tackapausha succeeded him during his lifetime, and Penhawitz's later life is not recorded.

In popular culture
A fictionalized version of Penhawitz appears in the 2008 children's fantasy novel Gods of Manhattan and its sequels.

See also
Oratam
Wampage

References

Native American leaders
Lenape people
17th-century Native Americans
People of New Netherland
People from Canarsie, Brooklyn
History of Brooklyn
Kieft's War